Aldborough was a parliamentary borough located in the West Riding of Yorkshire, abolished in the Great Reform Act of 1832.

Boundaries
Aldborough was a small borough (not even including the whole parish of Aldborough, since Boroughbridge, also within the boundaries, was also a borough with its own two MPs). By the time of the Reform Act it had a population only just over 500 and an electorate of less than 100. This made it a pocket borough and easy for the local landowner to dominate.

History
Aldborough returned two Members of Parliament (MPs) from 1558 until 1832.

 It was a "scot and lot" borough, meaning that any man paying the poor rate was eligible to vote.
 
In the 18th century, Aldborough was controlled by the Duke of Newcastle. In April 1754 Newcastle, who had just become Prime Minister, selected his junior colleague and future Prime Minister, William Pitt (Pitt the Elder), to sit as its MP. Pitt represented Aldborough for two-and-a-half years, but having fallen out with Newcastle and been dismissed from his ministry, he was forced to find a new constituency when he next needed to be re-elected to the Commons in 1756.

Members of Parliament 
Constituency created (1558)

MPs 1558–1640

MPs 1640–1832

Notes

Elections

Elections in the 1830s

References 

Robert Beatson, "A Chronological Register of Both Houses of Parliament" (London: Longman, Hurst, Res & Orme, 1807) 
Michael Brock,The Great Reform Act (London: Hutchinson, 1973).
D Brunton & D H Pennington, Members of the Long Parliament (London: George Allen & Unwin, 1954)
Cobbett's Parliamentary history of England, from the Norman Conquest in 1066 to the year 1803 (London: Thomas Hansard, 1808) 
D Englefield, J Seaton & I White, Facts About the British Prime Ministers (London: Mansell, 1995)
 Maija Jansson (ed.), Proceedings in Parliament, 1614 (House of Commons) (Philadelphia: American Philosophical Society, 1988) 
 J E Neale, The Elizabethan House of Commons (London: Jonathan Cape, 1949)
J Holladay Philbin, Parliamentary Representation 1832, England and Wales, (New Haven, Connecticut: Yale University Press, 1965)
Henry Stooks Smith, The Parliaments of England from 1715 to 1847 (2nd edition, edited by FWS Craig – Chichester: Parliamentary Reference Publications, 1973)
Frederic A Youngs, Jr, Guide to the Local Administrative Units of England, Volume I (London: Offices of the Royal Historical Society, 1979)

Parliamentary constituencies in Yorkshire and the Humber (historic)
Constituencies of the Parliament of the United Kingdom established in 1558
Constituencies of the Parliament of the United Kingdom disestablished in 1832
Rotten boroughs
Politics of the Borough of Harrogate
Boroughbridge